Astragalus coccineus is a species of milkvetch known by the common name scarlet locoweed or scarlet milkvetch. It is native to the deserts, scrub, and chaparral of the Southwestern United States in Arizona, California, and Nevada,  and in northwestern Mexico.

Description
Astragalus coccineus is a clumpy perennial herb coated thickly in white hairs. Leaves are up to 10 centimeters long and are made up of oblong, pointed leaflets. The plant can be distinguished from most other milkvetches by its large, bright scarlet flowers. The inflorescence has up to 10 flowers each 3 to 4 centimeters long, or longer.

The fruit is a plump legume pod which dries to a hairy, leathery texture. It is up to 4 centimeters long.

External links

Jepson Manual Treatment - Astragalus coccineus
USDA Plants Profile
Astragalus coccineus - Photo gallery

coccineus
Flora of Northwestern Mexico
Flora of Arizona
Flora of California
Flora of Nevada
Flora of the Great Basin
Flora of the California desert regions
Natural history of the California chaparral and woodlands
Natural history of the Mojave Desert
Natural history of the Peninsular Ranges
Taxa named by Townshend Stith Brandegee
Flora without expected TNC conservation status